Mollisonia is an extinct genus of Cambrian arthropod. Species are known from the Burgess Shale, Langston Formation, and Wheeler Shale of North America, as well as the Chengjiang Biota of China. Twenty-one specimens of Mollisonia are known from the Greater Phyllopod bed, where they comprise less than 0.1% of the community. Remains possibly attributable to the genus are also known from the Ordovician Fezouata Formation of Morocco and Bøggild Fjord Formation  Greenland. An observation published in 2019 suggests this genus is a basal chelicerate, closer to crown group Chelicerata than members of Habeliida. It is suggested to be closely related to Corcorania, Urokodia, and Thelxiope, which together form the clade Mollisoniida, which are thought to be closely related to Chelicerata.

References

External links 
 

Burgess Shale fossils
Cambrian arthropods
Prehistoric arthropod genera